Herstedøster Church is a church in the northern outskirts of Albertslund, Albertslund Municipality, Denmark. In medieval times, the Romanesque church was dedicated to Saint Nicholas. The tower is of late-Gothic origin. The church interior was given a major renovation in 1994 by Alan Havsteen-Mikkelsen. In 1973, R. Smalley discovered frescoes dated to around 1175, probably the date of origin of the church.
On 1 February 2009 a major fire broke out at the church.

References

External links
Official site

Churches in the Diocese of Helsingør
Buildings and structures in Albertslund Municipality
Churches in the Capital Region of Denmark
Lutheran churches converted from Roman Catholicism